Bezděkov is a municipality and village in Klatovy District in the Plzeň Region of the Czech Republic. It has about 900 inhabitants.

Administrative parts
Villages of Koryta, Poborovice, Struhadlo, Tetětice and Vítaná are administrative parts of Bezděkov.

Geography
It lies in the Švihov Highlands. The Úhlava River flows along the eastern municipal border and shortly through the municipality.

History

The first written mention of Bezděkov is from 1331. The village was probably founded in the 13th century.

Sights
The main landmark of Bezděkov is the Bezděkov Castle. The original castle was built on the site of an older Gothic fortress in 1737. In 1854–1856, the castle was rebuilt into its current Gothic Revival form by the architect Vojtěch Ignác Ullmann. Today, the castle is privately owned and inaccessible.

The Church of Saint Anne on a hill near Bezděkov dates from 1693. After its capacity became insufficient, the Church of Saint Wenceslaus was built in the centre of the village in 1899–1901. It belongs to the youngest churches in the region.

Notable people
Christian Heinrich Spiess (1755–1799), German writer; lived and died here

Gallery

References

External links

Villages in Klatovy District